Niccolò Machiavelli started work with the chancery in Florence at the age of 29, traveling on diplomatic missions around Europe.  In the 14 years he served the chancery, he met great statesmen and politicians, including Louis XII, Emperor Maximilian and Cesare Borgia, and gained great insight into the political workings of Europe. He gave Florentine generals successful military advice concerning tactics and organizing infantry forces.  He even established a Florentine militia. When the Medici came back into power in 1512, Machiavelli was arrested, tortured and exiled from Florence.

Work
Machiavelli, having lost the one vocation he understood, turned to writing, the closest thing to being in office he could now experience. In his writing he drew from his years of experience and understanding of the working of a successful "prince."  The Prince, published in 1513, was a how-to book on securing and maintaining political power. He did not censor his occasional inhumane methods and was entirely honest in his political advice, earning him an infamous reputation. In his work he wrote about the use of trickery and artfulness and how a ruler is sometimes compelled to do evil in order to maintain power.

Machiavelli recommends, "one must know how to color one's actions and be a great feigner and dissembler."  He concludes that "it is a general rule about men, that they are ungrateful, fickle, liars and deceivers, fearful of danger and greedy for gain." He states that a prince who acts virtuously will soon come to his end in a sea of people who are not virtuous themselves. Thus, the successful prince must be dishonest and immoral when necessary.  He states that "we see from recent experience that those princes have accomplished most who paid little heed to keeping their promises, but who knew how to manipulate the minds of men craftily.  In the end, they won out over those who tried to act honestly."  Machiavelli advocates cunning political maneuvers as the best way to hold onto power.

Machiavelli emphasizes that a ruler must be able to do evil, because to maintain political power sometimes requires one to act without scruples. Machiavelli uses the example of Agathocles the Sicilian. Agathocles had the entire senate of Syracuse killed in order to seize control of the government. Machiavelli admits that this is a way to gain power, but not glory, because criminal actions are never viewed in a positive light.

The Prince was originally dedicated to Giuliano di Lorenzo de' Medici. The Medicis, however, did not accept Machiavelli into their favor until 1520. According to The Princes translator, Robert M. Adams, "he was an instinctive dramatist, and one of the dramatic effects he most enjoyed producing was shock and outrage."

From The Prince to Mandragola 

Machiavelli wrote Mandragola after The Prince to rehash his political commentary for the upperclass. Theatre is a cautious means of exposing truths because the audience connects with the action, but is removed enough from the stage that there is no looming fear. Like in The Prince, Machiavelli argues that uniting opportunistic fortune and skillful strength allows for competence and accord.

Machiavelli used those words, fortuna and virtù, literally and figuratively in both pieces to demonstrate that immorality is acceptable when the ends justify the means. In Mandragola, Machiavelli dramatically portrays these ideas by making the protagonist boast virtù and his leading lady encompass fortuna. The protagonist Callimaco is the virtuous prince that Machiavelli alludes to in The Prince; he has the fervent aspiration, but also the willingness to endanger his life that make him deserving of his love Lucrezia and worthy of authority. Opposedly, the antagonist Nicia who already holds power, like an inherited prince, owes himself to Fortuna and loses her because of his passiveness. By having the characters overstep each other to better themselves, Machiavelli uses commedia dell'arte (artful comedy) to portray recent Florentine political events. Therefore, each character is representative of a political figurehead, again reiterating ideas from The Prince with the help of masks and stock figures.

In Mandragola there is the classic old husband, youthful wife, competent charlatan and foraging assistant. But Machiavelli also uses Commedia Erudita (learned comedy) to complicate his script by referencing ancient, virtuous, pedagogical texts. The characters are named from Greek etymologies and the storyline's action is resolved in a day's time without much change of scenery. The deception of infidelity in Mandragola paired with the play's vague conclusion allow for independent contemplation, which unifies the audience. The styling techniques and accumulated knowledge permit Machiavelli's characters to be multiple personalities throughout history, tying back directly to The Prince and relating to current day.

Trickery

The function of trickery appears as a central theme in Machiavelli's Commedia Erudita, Mandragola. The key role that fraud plays in the resolution of the comedy's complications is constantly reaffirmed through the characters’ crafty manipulations. It is apparent that without the use of trickery in Mandragola, the characters’ endeavors would lack success. We are ultimately exposed to fraud as a force that prevails over even society's most valued ideals such as education, religion, and morals.

Like typical works of Commedia Erudita, Mandragola progresses sequentially through an exposition, complication, and resolution. In the resolution Machiavelli exhibits his acceptance of deceit as a valid means of attaining one's goal by rewarding his dishonest characters with success, instead of punishing them with failure.

In Mandragola, trickery is employed as a tool for fulfilling the desires of the characters. The characters also exploit one another's desires in order to achieve their personal goals. Machiavelli uses stock figures as a way of explaining political themes and satirizing familiar societal elements.

Machiavelli establishes persuasion as the center of almost every scene by embedding rhetoric into the character dialogue. Rhetoric is implemented in the interactions of the theatrical characters from the start to the finish of the play: Ligurio fuels Callimaco's anticipation and hope concerning Lucrezia; Ligurio wins the trust and support of Nicia; Ligurio convinces Frate Timoteo of the advantageous aspects of his ploy; Frate Timoteo and Sostrata seek to persuade Lucrezia; Callimaco pressures Nicia; and so on. In each of these examples, the characters use elaborate and insincere language in order to persuade one another. Dramatist Machiavelli incorporates the traditional functions of classical rhetoric-reason (logos), character (ethos) and emotion (pathos)- into the play to collectively build a vivid, as well as subtlety instructive experience for his audience.

In Mandragola, Ligurio is the mastermind behind the manipulation, the root of the play's dramatic deception. Many scholars have interpreted Ligurio, the ultimate symbol of virtú in Mandragola, as a ‘self-portrait’ of Machiavelli. Ligurio assembles the spectrum of schemes in the play, from the Mandrake potion, to Frate Timoteo's assistance, to Callimaco's disguise and capture by Nicia. Though every character in the play participates in some form of a manipulative act, Ligurio stands out because of his impressive adaptability to tribulations.

Even more extraordinary is Ligurio's aptitude for judging human character. This comprehension of character is the type of awareness that is necessary for successful acts of manipulation. One of the many places we experience Ligurio's qualitative insight is in his relationship with Nicia. Ligurio exploits Nicia's inanity, and uses Nicia's hopes, fears, and insecurities to maneuver Nicia to suit his specific goals.

Drama is usually exemplified by a story's involvement of conflict or contrast of character. In Machiavelli's Mandragola, this dramatic disparity is demonstrated through Frate Timoteo. Though most readers expect the friar to be the most honest character, he ironically turns out to be just as devious as tricksters Ligurio and Callimaco. As an untrustworthy member of the Christian Church, Friar Timoteo takes advantage of his powers in order to exploit innocent women.

When Ligurio requests Frate Timoteo's help in persuading Lucrezia, Timoteo is conscious that there is a duplicitous quality to Ligurio's plan, but agrees to help anyway.
 
" I don’t know which one has duped the other…. nevertheless, this trick is to my profit…. I’ll get a lot from each of them... it's convenient for the thing to be kept secret, because telling it matters as much to them as to me. Be that as it may, I don’t repent it. It's quite true that I’m afraid there will be difficulties, because Madonna Lucrezia is wise and good; but I’ll dupe her by her goodness." (Machiavelli, 34) 
 
Friar Timoteo maintains a personal justification for his actions, blatantly disregarding the shame of his decisions for the financial benefits of the deal. In this way, Friar Timoteo is being self-deceptive. He swears by his innocence, with the rationale that sin is contingent on the presence of bad intentions in committing an act. He concludes that since he has ‘good’ intentions, he is therefore free of sin.

Frate Timoteo's character is dramatic because he undermines the expectations that both the audience and the theatrical characters have for him. He tricks the audience with the irony of his character; his familiar title ‘friar’ leads the audience to assume that he will act a certain way, but in reality he acts contrarily to those assumptions. In the play, Friar Timoteo takes advantage of Lucrezia's trust in his dependability, and leads Lucrezia to believe that his opinion of the plan is genuine and valid.

Analysis of the theme 
One theme up to debate is whether or not "the ends justify the means" for maintaining order. In Mandragola, Callimaco, a young Florentine, desires Lucrezia, the wife in a childless marriage to Nicia. Callimaco impersonates a doctor who possesses a fabricated drug capable of killing the man with whom Lucrezia sleeps with and bringing her a child. No matter how manipulative Callimaco is as he tries to attain Lucrezia, his cunning and clever tactics succeed, and it is even Nicia who leads Callimaco (disguised as a common man) to Lucrezia's bedroom. After the conception, Lucrezia is aware of Callimaco's deception, but still accepts him into her private life:

"Since your astuteness, my husbands stupidity, my mother's simplicity, and my confessors wickedness have led me to do what I never would have done myself, I’m determined to judge that it comes from heavenly disposition which has so willed; and I don’t have it in me to reject what Heaven wills me to accept. Therefore, I take you as my lord, master, and guide; you are my father, my defender, and I want you to be my every good;"

Callimaco's scheming proves successful in the end. Lucrezia attains happiness and order for she is pregnant. While the plot is comic and based in a domestic realm, many scholars have recognized the gaps in the plot and argue that a more careful read of the work "contains dangerous elements of Machiavelli's political teaching."
Some theorize that Callimaco is Machiavelli's described leader in The Prince as he follows what is natural to man, to rule, to attain things, and to consolidate power through scheming social and political structures. Just as the passion to rule is common in man, it is an allegory to Callimaco's sexual conquest of Lucrezia. Some argue against this theory, revealing that seduction is not simply a symbol for conspiracy, but that "seduction is seduction to Machiavelli" who believes the two are "virtually interchangeable phenomena".

In approaching Mandragola through the political analysis, Lucrezia has been viewed as the "Italy" to be conquered. Her defeat is generally viewed as the fall of a virtuous rule by corrupt means or the upheaval of an ignorant reign to ensure a more stable order. As a virtuous woman, Lucrezia surrenders her virtue not to the charming Callimaco but to the treachery of Timoteo, the corrupt friar, and the stupidity of her husband. Being so, she has the same name as the wife of Collatinus, a character of virtue in Machiavelli's Republic Rome. She also holds the same title as the Lucretia of Ancient Rome who brought kingly rule to end by succumbing to violence. Others rebuke, believing Machiavelli's Lucrezia physically and metaphorically becomes the "mother of a new line of rulers in Florence."  Callimaco's quest for power through the conquest of Lucrezia is what lends an underlying drama to the comedic theatrical Mandragola.

References 

Italian Renaissance writers
Dramatist